Talasari is a city and a municipal council in Palghar district of Maharashtra state in Konkan division. It is one of the talukas of Palghar district.

References

Cities and towns in Palghar district
Talukas in Maharashtra